

Petric, Petrić, Petrič or Petrich may refer to:

Places
Veliki Petrič, fortress in Serbia
Mali Petrič, fortress in Serbia
Petrich, a town in Bulgaria

People 
 Petrić, a South Slavic surname found in Bosnia, Croatia, Serbia, Slovenia
 Petrich (surname), a surname found in the United States, Hungary, Poland, Australia
 Petrič (surname), a South Slavic surname found in Slovenia
Daniel Petric, an American convicted murderer
 Faith Petric, American folk singer and activist
Mihai Petric, a Moldovan painter

Other uses
 Petric (band), a Canadian country music band

See also
 Petrich (disambiguation)